Xylosma fawcettii is a species of flowering plant in the family Salicaceae. It is endemic to Jamaica.

References

fawcettii
Endemic flora of Jamaica
Taxonomy articles created by Polbot